Elizabeth "Ely" Pouget (born August 30, 1961) is an American actress and former model.

After studying film at the University of Miami, Pouget's first role came in 1985 when she played Rosella Maestres on the television series Miami Vice. In 1987 she played Gina in the series The A-Team. Her first film was The Wrong Guys (1988). She played Leslie Reins on TV in Friday the 13th: The Series and starred in the made for television movies Shannon's Deal and L.A. Takedown, directed by Michael Mann. She played Sarah Downs in Young Riders and Maggie Evans in Dark Shadows.

Filmography

Film 

Although credited, Pouget doesn't actually appear in the film, suggesting her scene was deleted before release.

Television

References

External links

1961 births
American female models
American film actresses
American television actresses
Living people
Actresses from Newark, New Jersey
University of Miami alumni
21st-century American women